The following is an incomplete list of Georgia Bulldogs football seasons. The Bulldogs currently compete in the Southeastern Conference, and have an overall record of 853-428-54 in 127 seasons.

Seasons

References

Georgia

Georgia Bulldogs football seasons